Action (abbr. A or Az) is a liberal political party in Italy. Its leader is Carlo Calenda, a member of the European Parliament within the group of Renew Europe and former minister of Economic Development.

Originally launched as We Are Europeans (SE), it adopted its current name in November 2019 upon becoming a fully-fledged party. Calenda has described his party as "anti-populist" and "anti-souverainist". He also explained that the party's name is a historical reference to the short-lived post-World War II Action Party and an allusion to Carlo Rosselli's "liberal socialism". According to Calenda, the party is home to "pure liberals, but also liberal progressives [social liberals, like Calenda] and Catholic democrats [Christian democrats]". Action is a member of the European Democratic Party, alongside its associated party Italia Viva.

History

Background
Carlo Calenda, who had been active within Luca Cordero di Montezemolo's Future Italy, was an unsuccessful candidate for the centrist Civic Choice (SC) party in the 2013 general election. However, he served in various capacities (deputy minister, ambassador and minister) in the three governments of the 2013–2018 legislative term. In the aftermath of the 2018 general election, he officially joined the centre-left Democratic Party (PD).

We Are Europeans
In January 2019 Calenda launched a political manifesto named We Are Europeans, with the aim of creating a joint list composed of the PD and other progressive and pro-Europeanist parties for the upcoming European Parliament election. His proposal was welcomed by Nicola Zingaretti, then leader of the PD, but rejected by other parties within the centre-left coalition, including More Europe (+E) and Italia in Comune. In the run-up to the election, Zingaretti and Calenda presented a logo for their joint electoral list including a reference to We Are Europeans and the symbol of the Party of European Socialists. Additionally, they also joined with Article One, a left-wing party established in 2017 by splinters from the PD, led by former PD secretary Pier Luigi Bersani. The PD–SE joint list gained 22.7% of the vote, coming second after the League. Calenda, who ran in the North-East constituency, received more than 270,000 votes, thus becoming the most voted candidate of the list, and joined the Progressive Alliance of Socialists and Democrats (S&D) group.

In August 2019, tensions grew within the coalition supporting the first government of Giuseppe Conte, leading to the issuing of a motion of no-confidence by the League. During the following government crisis, the PD national board officially endorsed the possibility of forming a new cabinet in a coalition with the Five Star Movement (M5S), based on pro-Europeanism, green economy, sustainable development, fight against economic inequality and a new immigration policy. The party also agreed to keep Conte as the head of the new government, and on 29 August, President Sergio Mattarella re-appointed Conte as Prime Minister, this time at the head of a centre-left coalition. Calenda strongly opposed the new government, stating that the PD had renounced any representation of the "reformists", and that therefore it became necessary to establish a "liberal-progressive" movement. Calenda left the PD and on 5 September 2019, while Conte's second government was sworn in, announced the transformation of SE into a full-fledged party.

On 10 September 2019, Matteo Richetti, a prominent PD senator with a Catholic political upbringing and a close associate of former Prime Minister Matteo Renzi, abstained in the vote of confidence on the new government, and subsequently exited the party. He stated that he would join forces with Calenda.

Road to the new party

In November 2019, SE was officially transformed into a new party named Action, which was organised also at the local level through the so-called "Action Groups". Calenda explained Action's "reformist" nature, while Richetti that "Action would not be a centrist party, but the true progressive pole of the country". Early donors of the party included Alberto Bombassei and Luciano Cimmino, both former MPs elected with SC.

In August 2020, two members of the Chamber of Deputies joined Action: former minister Enrico Costa, who had earlier left Forza Italia (FI) and a long-time advocate of reforms of the judiciary, and Nunzio Angiola, university professor and former member of the M5S.

In November 2020, deputies and senators affiliated with Action formed joint sub-groups in the Mixed Groups together with +E both in the Chamber and in the Senate. The sub-group in the Chamber counted four deputies, the one in the Senate three senators.

In March 2021, Carlo Cottarelli, a former director of the International Monetary Fund, was chosen by A, +E, the Italian Republican Party (PRI), the Liberal Democratic Alliance for Italy (ALI) and The Liberals to head of a scientific committee designed to elaborate of a joint political program.

In the 2021 municipal election in Rome Calenda came third with 19.8% of the vote and the "Calenda for Mayor" list, comprising A, +E, PRI, IV and other minor liberal and centrist groups, won 19.1% of the vote, becoming the most voted list, ahead of the PD (whose candidate, Roberto Gualtieri, had launched a parallel "Gualtieri for Mayor" list and was elected at in the run-off).

In November 2021, Calenda left the S&D group in the European Parliament, after that it was hinted that the M5S might have joined it, and switched to Renew Europe.

In January 2022, the party formed a federation with +E.

Founding congress
On 19–20 February 2022, the party held its first congress, during which Calenda was elected secretary, Richetti president, Emma Fattorini (a former senator of the PD) and Giulia Pastorella vice presidents. The assembly welcomed several guest speakers, notably including Stéphane Séjourné of Renew Europe, Enrico Letta of the PD, Giancarlo Giorgetti of the League, Antonio Tajani of FI and Ettore Rosato of IV, as well as Benedetto Della Vedova of +E and the representatives of the other liberal parties with which Action had been cooperating. Calenda explained that Action would dialogue with all main parties, except the M5S and the Brothers of Italy (FdI), whose leaders were not invited to participate in the congress.

A few days before the congress, Barbara Masini had switched from FI. In the coming weeks, senator Leonardo Grimani (ex-PD and ex-IV) and deputies Claudio Pedrazzini, Osvaldo Napoli and Daniela Ruffino (all three ex-FI and ex-Cambiamo!) and Giorgio Trizzino (ex-M5S) joined the party.

2022 general election
In July 2022 the M5S did not participate in a Senate's confidence vote on a government bill. Prime Minister Draghi offered his resignation, which was rejected by President Mattarella. After a few days, Draghi sought a confidence vote again to secure the government majority supporting his cabinet, while rejecting the proposal put forward by Lega and FI of a new government without the M5S. In that occasion, the M5S, Lega, FI and FdI did not participate in the vote. Consequently, Draghi tendered his final resignation to President Mattarella, who dissolved the houses of Parliament, leading to the 2022 general election. Calenda, who also had favoured a Draghi government without the M5S, was very critical of Lega and FI.

In the aftermath of Draghi's resignation, senator Andrea Cangini switched from FI to Action. Contextually, Calenda hoped that also other leading dissidents of FI, including ministers Mariastella Gelmini and Mara Carfagna, could soon join the party. After Calenda's call, both Gelmini and Carfagna signalled that they would do so and were formally welcomed in the party during a press conference with Calenda. Contextually, other deputies followed the two ministers out of FI and joined Action.

In early August Az/+E formed a political pact with the PD, that would give 3 candidates in single-seat constituencies to Az/+E for every 7 candidates given to the PD. Less than a week later, Calenda announced that he was walking away from the pact because of the parallel alliances that the PD had signed with the Greens and Left Alliance (formed by Green Europe and Italian Left) and Civic Commitment (led by Luigi Di Maio and Bruno Tabacci). Calenda's decision may led to the break-up of the federation with +E, as the latter's leaders want to continue their alliance with the PD. Finally, Action formed a joint electoral list with Matteo Renzi's Italia Viva (IV).

In the aftermath of the election, during a national assembly in Naples, the party elected Carafagna as president with 84% of the delegates' vote, replacing Richetti, who had become the leader in the Chamber of Deputies. The party also approved a path toward a stable federation with IV with 93% of the vote.

Notable members
Other than Carlo Calenda, leading members of the party include Mariastella Gelmini (ex-FI), Mara Carfagna (ex-FI), Matteo Richetti (ex-PD), Enrico Costa (ex-FI), Gianni Pittella (ex-PD), Raffaele Bonanni (former secretary-general of the Italian Confederation of Workers' Trade Unions), Vincenzo Camporini (former Chief of the Defence Staff), Mario Raffaelli (former long-time deputy and under-secretary for the Italian Socialist Party), Walter Ricciardi (former president of the Istituto Superiore di Sanità) and Ugo Rossi (former President of Trentino).

Electoral results

Italian Parliament

Regional Councils

Leadership
Secretary: Carlo Calenda (2022–present)
Deputy Secretary: Enrico Costa (2022–present), Andrea Mazziotti (2022–present)
Coordinator: Andrea Mazziotti (2022–present)
President: Matteo Richetti (2022), Mara Carfagna (2022–present)
Vice President: Emma Fattorini (2022–present), Giulia Pastorella (2022–present)
Spokesperson: Valentina Grippo (2022–present)

Symbols

References

External links
 Official website

2019 establishments in Italy
Centrist parties in Italy
Pro-European political parties in Italy
Democratic Party (Italy) breakaway groups
Liberal parties in Italy
Political parties established in 2019